Drymodromia is a genus of flies in the family Empididae.

Species
D. beckeri Smith, 1969
D. bimaculata Wagner & Andersen, 1995
D. capensis Smith, 1969
D. femorata Smith, 1969
D. flaviventris Wagner & Andersen, 1995
D. gahinga Garrett-Jones, 1940
D. jeanneli Becker, 1914
D. maculipennis Smith, 1969
D. plurabella Garrett-Jones, 1940
D. pseudofemorata Smith, 1969
D. reducta Smith, 1969
D. seticosta Garrett-Jones, 1940
D. similis Smith, 1969
D. simplex Smith, 1969
D. trivittata Smith, 1969
D. trochanterata Smith, 1969

References

Empidoidea genera
Taxa named by Theodor Becker
Empididae